Matt Elento, also known as Matt or Matlife, is an American League of Legends coach for Evil Geniuses' academy team. Formerly a support player, he has played for professional teams such as Team Liquid and Golden Guardians.

Career 
Elento played for Team Liquid of the North American League of Legends Championship Series (NA LCS).

In December 2020, Elento became the head coach of Evil Geniuses' academy team.

Tournament results 
 5th — 2016 NA LCS Summer regular season

References 

Team Liquid players
Living people
League of Legends support players
American esports players
Year of birth missing (living people)
Native Hawaiian people
Team Liquid Academy players
League of Legends coaches